The 1995 Cork Junior Hurling Championship was the 98th staging of the Cork Junior Hurling Championship since its establishment by the Cork County Board. The championship ran from 10 September to 22 October 1995.

The final was played on 22 October 1995 at Páirc Uí Chaoimh in Cork between Killeagh and Ballinhassig, in what was their first ever meeting in the final. Killeagh won the match by 3-09 to 2-08 to claim their first ever championship title.

Killeagh's Joe Deane and Ballinhassig's Seán McCarthy were the championship's top scorers.

Qualification

Results

Quarter-finals

Semi-finals

Final

Championship statistics

Top scorers

Overall

In a single game

References

Cork Junior Hurling Championship
Cork Junior Hurling Championship